Camerunia albida is a moth of the family Eupterotidae first described by Per Olof Christopher Aurivillius in 1901. It is found in Tanzania.

References

External links

Aurivillius, C. 1901. On the Ethiopean genera of the family Striphnopterygidae. - Bihang till Kongliga Svenska Vetenskaps Akademiens Handlingar 27(7 (suppl.)):1–33, pls. 1–5.
Swedish Museum of Natural History: images of the type

Endemic fauna of Tanzania
Moths described in 1901
Janinae
Moths of Africa